The Door is the 19th studio album by American musician Charlie Daniels. Released on March 14, 1994 by Sparrow Records, the album was the first of three Christian albums Daniels recorded for the label. It reached No. 26 on Billboard's Christian albums chart on May 13, 1994, spending twelve weeks on that chart.

Critical reception

AllMusic called the album "less vengeful and apocalyptic than Steel Witness", Daniels' second Christian album for Sparrow.

Track listing

Musicians

Charlie Daniels – Vocals, Fiddle, Guitar, Mandolin
Joel "Taz" DiGregorio – Keyboards
Jack Gavin – Percussion, Drums
Bruce Brown – Guitar, Vocals
Charlie Hayward – Bass
Carolyn Corlew – Vocals
Joy Gardner – Vocals
Christ Church Choir – Vocals

Production

Ron W. Griffin – Producer, Engineer
David Corlew – Executive-Producer
John Ketton – Engineer
John Thomas, II – Assistant Engineer
Rick Cobbie – Assistant Engineer
Tim LaMoy – Assistant Engineer
Ed Torney – Assistant Engineer
Roger Campbell – Guitar Technician
Pete Green – Mixer
Hank Williams – Masterer
Bebe Evans – Production Coordinator
Paula Szeigis – Production Coordinator
Karen Philpott – Art Direction
Sara Remke – Design

Track information and credits adapted from the album's liner notes.

Charts

References

1994 albums
Charlie Daniels albums
Sparrow Records albums